RheinStars Köln is a professional basketball club based in Cologne, Germany. The team currently plays in the Regionalliga, the fourth tier basketball league in Germany. The club has won one Basketball Bundesliga championship and three German Cup titles in its history.

History
The team was founded 1999, as Cologne 99ers. In the Euroleague 2006-07 season, their home arena was an arena in Düsseldorf, Germany, named Philips Halle.

RheinEnergie power company supported the team until the summer of 2007, thus the team changed to its original name, Köln 99ers. On January 21, 2008, the club announced that they were insolvent.

In 2013, the club was re-launched and started in the 2.Regionliga (5th division) with the new name of RheinStars Köln.  Since 2015, the team plays in the ProA, Germany's second division of professional basketball. In 2018-19 season, the team was relegated to the Regionalliga from ProB (Germany's 3rd division of professional basketball) after finishing the season 5-17.

Honours
German Champion: (1)
2005–06
German Cup: (3) 
2004, 2005, 2007
BBL Champions Cup: (1)
2006

Players

Current roster

Notable players

Season by season

Head coaches
  Svetislav Pešić (2001–02)
  Stephan Baeck (2002)
  Saša Obradović (2005–08)
  Drasko Prodanovic

Notes

External links
 Official site
 Official site of the Academy

Basketball teams in Germany
Sport in Cologne
Basketball teams established in 1999
1999 establishments in Germany